Hoseynabad-e Sedaqat (also Romanized as Ḩoseynābād-e Şedāqat) is a village in Takab Rural District, in the Central District of Dargaz County, Razavi Khorasan Province, Iran.

Demographics 
At the 2006 census, its population was 64, in 18 families.

References 

Populated places in Dargaz County